Bear Creek is the name of some places in the U.S. state of Wisconsin:
Bear Creek, Outagamie County, Wisconsin, a village
Bear Creek, Sauk County, Wisconsin, a township
Bear Creek, Waupaca County, Wisconsin, a town
Bear Creek Corners, Wisconsin, an unincorporated community

nl:Bear Creek (Wisconsin)
pt:Bear Creek (Wisconsin)